Negative selection may refer to:

In biology
Negative selection (natural selection), the selective removal of rare alleles that are deleterious
Negative selection (artificial selection), when negative, rather than positive, traits of a species are selected for

In politics
Negative selection (politics), a process that occurs in rigid hierarchies, most notably dictatorships

In immunology
Negative selection (immunology), in which B-cells and T-cells that recognize MHC molecules bound to peptides of self-origin, or just MHC molecules with high affinity are deleted from the repertoire of immune cells.